The antihelix (anthelix) is a part of the visible ear; the pinna.
The antihelix is a curved prominence of cartilage parallel with and in front of the helix on the pinna.

The antihelix divides above into two legs or crura; the crura antihelicis, between which is a triangular depression, the fossa triangularis.

Additional images

External links
  (#5)

Auditory system